Sphingomonas cynarae  is a Gram-negative, non-spore-forming, rod-shaped and non-motile bacteria from the genus of Sphingomonas which has been isolated from the phyllosphere of the plant Cynara cardunculus var. sylvestris in Lecce in Italy.

References

Further reading

External links
Type strain of Sphingomonas cynarae at BacDive -  the Bacterial Diversity Metadatabase

cynarae
Bacteria described in 2013